Mateo Tannatt (born 1979) is an American artist based in Los Angeles, California, United States.

He works in a variety of media and often creates sculptures, which incorporate live actions or performances. In one work, a baby grand piano is dropped from a height of 80 feet to create an audio "composition."

Selected exhibitions

2012

"When Attitude Becomes Form Becomes Attitude" – Wattis Institute for Contemporary Arts, San Francisco

2011

"All of This and Nothing" – The Hammer Museum, Los Angeles

2010

"Rendezvous Vous" – Marc Foxx Gallery, Los Angeles

2009
"Second Nature: The Valentine-Adelson Collection" – The Hammer Museum, Los Angeles

2008

"Plein Air" – Marc Foxx Gallery, Los Angeles
"Present/Futures" – Artissima, Turin, Italy – winner of the Illy Present Future Prize

2007
"Brain Form" – Guild & Greyshkul, New York
"Reality Disorder" – Susanne Vielmetter Los Angeles Projects, Los Angeles

2006

GRUPE, Gavin Brown's Enterprise at Passerby, New York City

2005

Bigger than the Sun, Smaller than You, Guild & Greyshkul, New York

Put it in Your Mouth/I'll see you on the dark side of the prune, Rivington Arms, New York

References

External links
Images, biography and texts from the Saatchi Gallery
Mateo Tannatt on ArtFacts.net
Mateo Tannat at Marc Foxx Gallery

American artists
Living people
1979 births